Horst Schuldes (18 March 1939 – 5 December 2015) was a German ice hockey player. He competed in the men's tournaments at the 1960 Winter Olympics and the 1964 Winter Olympics.

References

External links
 

1939 births
2015 deaths
Olympic ice hockey players of Germany
Olympic ice hockey players of the United Team of Germany
Ice hockey players at the 1960 Winter Olympics
Ice hockey players at the 1964 Winter Olympics
Sportspeople from Chomutov
Sudeten German people